Cho Chang-ho (October 2, 1930 – November 19, 2006) was a South Korean military officer. He served South Korea, during the Korean War.

Cho Chang-ho is known as the first South Korean POW to escape from North Korea after the Korean Armistice Agreement in 1953.

Early life and education
Cho Chang-ho was born in Pyongyang. His family moved to Seoul in 1936. and he graduated from Gyeonggi Commercial High school and entered Yonsei University in 1950.

On 25 June 1950, with the outbreak of Korean War, he entered the Republic of Korea Army in October 1950 and became an ROK Army officer in April 1951.

Korean War
In May 1951, he took part in the Battle of Hanseok Mountain at Inje County and became a POW of the Chinese Army.

He was interned for 43 years in North Korea.

Escape
In October 1994, he escaped from North Korea and returned to South Korea.

In South Korea, he devoted the rest of his life to the repatriation effort of other POWs.

In 2006, he attended United States House Committee on Foreign Affairs and testified about the POW issue

Death and legacy
Cho Chang-ho died on 19 November 2006.

In popular culture
Cho Chang-ho on-screen.
 Cha In-pyo in South Korean movie Albatross

See also
Korean War POWs detained in North Korea

References

1930 births
2006 deaths
South Korean military personnel of the Korean War
South Korean anti-communists
ROK Armed Forces prisoners of war in the Korean War